Different Kind of Blue may refer to:

 A Different Kind of Blue, a Miles Davis live DVD
 "Different Kind of Blue", a song by Nick Lowe on the album The Convincer
 "Different Kind of Blue", a song by Gay Dad on the album Leisure Noise